Vicki Gregory (1968–2019) was a British microbiologist and international expert on influenza. Gregory served as stalwart of the Worldwide Influenza Centre at the Francis Crick Institute in London.

Early life and education 
Gregory was born in 1968 in Birmingham, England. Her parents were businessperson Steve Gregory and librarian Sue Gregory (née Higgins). Gregory's family later moved to Hemel Hempstead, Hertfordshire. There, she completed her secondary education at the math and computing academy Longdean School. Gregory attended the University College London and received a degree in microbiology. From there, she went to research global influenza viruses at the Francis Crick Institute.

Career and research 
Gregory was stalwart of the Worldwide Influenza Centre at the Francis Crick Institute. Gregory collaborated with many World Health Organization laboratories such as those of the Global Influenza Surveillance and Response System (GISRS). Gregory was a founding member of GISAID's Database Technical Group.

She also "co-authored a number of advisory commentaries on influenza virus risks and was a key person in signing off the annually revised composition of the influenza virus vaccine for the northern hemisphere."

Personal life and death 
In 2008, Gregory married Kieron O’Neill and they had a daughter.

Gregory died of cancer, aged 51, in 2019.

References 

1968 births
2019 deaths
English microbiologists
Influenza researchers